The 1931–32 Scottish Cup was the 54th staging of Scotland's most prestigious football knockout competition. The Cup was won by Rangers who defeated Kilmarnock in the replayed final.

Fourth round

Semi-finals

Final

Replay

Teams

See also 
1929 Scottish Cup Final – played between the same teams
 1931–32 in Scottish football

References

Scottish Cup seasons
Scot
Cup